Svitlana Krakovska is a Ukrainian climate scientist and head of the Ukrainian delegation to the Intergovernmental Panel on Climate Change (IPCC). She is an applied climatologist who introduced climate models to Ukraine.

References

External links 
https://www.researchgate.net/profile/Svitlana-Krakovska
https://climateoutreach.org/case-studies-from-ipcc-authors/ukraine/

Ukrainian climatologists
Living people
Year of birth missing (living people)
Scientists from Kyiv
21st-century Ukrainian women scientists
Women climatologists